This is a list of extinct languages of Africa, languages which have undergone language death, have no native speakers and no spoken descendant.

There are 49 languages listed; 11 from Eastern Africa, 8 from Middle Africa, 17 from Northern Africa, 3 from Southern Africa, 10 from Western Africa.

Eastern Africa

Eritrea
Geez
Italian Eritrean

Ethiopia
Gafat
Mesmes
Weyto

Kenya
Kore

Madagascar
Vazimba (with Glottolog code, unclassifiable)

Tanzania
Kw'adza
Ngasa

Uganda
Nyang'i
Singa

Middle Africa

Angola
Kwadi

Cameroon
Duli
Gey (possibly a dialect of Duli)
Nagumi
Yeni

Chad
Horo
Muskum

Democratic Republic of the Congo
Ngbee

Northern Africa
Ancient Nubian

Algeria
Numidian

Egypt
Ancient Egyptian

Sudan
Baygo
Berti
Birked
Gule
Homa
Meroitic
Mittu
Togoyo
Torona

Tunisia
African Romance
Mediterranean Lingua Franca
Punic
Sened
Vandalic

Southern Africa

South Africa
ǁXegwi
ǀXam
Seroa

Western Africa

Ivory Coast
Esuma
Gbin

Nigeria
Ajawa
Auyokawa
Basa-Gumna
Gamo-Ningi
Kpati
Kubi
Mawa
Teshenawa

See also
Languages of Africa
List of endangered languages in Africa

References 

Africa
Extinct languages of Africa
Extinct languages